"Better Love" is a song performed by Greek-Canadian singer Katerine Duska. The song represented Greece in the Eurovision Song Contest 2019 in Tel Aviv, where it placed 21st in the final with 74 points. It was released on 6 March 2019.

Musical and lyrical content 
"Better Love" was written by Duska, Greek singer-songwriter Leon of Athens, and Scottish singer-songwriter David Sneddon. The song was described by ERT, Greece's competing broadcaster, as a song about higher love, more specifically unconditional and unapologetic love. Duska explained that the song was meant to express a form of invitation, or embrace, to understand about love and what love actually means. The song was written in D-sharp.

At Eurovision

Internal selection
Duska was announced as the Greek representative at the central news program of ERT on February 14, 2019, while the song title was revealed two days after. The official video clip was shown on 6 March 2019, on a special show for ERT's new program.

In Tel Aviv
The Eurovision Song Contest 2019 took place at the Expo Tel Aviv in Tel Aviv, Israel and consisted of two semi-finals on 14 and 16 May, and the final on 18 May 2019. According to Eurovision rules, each country, except the host country and the "Big Five" (France, Germany, Italy, Spain and the United Kingdom), will be required to qualify from one of two semi-finals to compete for the final; the top ten countries from each semi-final will progress to the final. In January 2019, it was announced that "Better Love" would be performed in the second half of the first semi-final on 14 May 2019. The song was set to perform in running order 16, after Portugal's 'Telemoveis' and before San Marino's 'Say Na Na Na'. It was performed during the first semi-final on 14 May 2019, and qualified for the final. It finished in 21st place with 74 points.

Track listing

Charts

References

2019 singles
2019 songs
English-language Greek songs
Eurovision songs of 2019
Eurovision songs of Greece
Songs written by David Sneddon